McMinns Summit is an unincorporated community in Jefferson County, in the U.S. state of Pennsylvania.

The community shares its name with a nearby drainage divide.

References

Unincorporated communities in Jefferson County, Pennsylvania
Unincorporated communities in Pennsylvania